Édgar Brenes   is a Costa Rican architect and professor at the University of Costa Rica School of Architecture.

References

This article was initially translated from the Spanish Wikipedia.

Costa Rican architects
Year of birth missing (living people)
Living people
Academic staff of the University of Costa Rica